Miss Pará is a Brazilian Beauty pageant which selects the representative for the State of Pará at the Miss Brazil contest. The pageant was created in 1955 and has been held every year since with the exception of 1990-1991, 1993, and 2020. The pageant is held annually with representation of several municipalities. Since 2022, the State director of Miss Pará is, Nathália Lago. Pará has won only one crown in the national contest:

, from Belém, in 1982.

Results Summary

Placements
Miss Brazil:  (1982)
1st Runner-Up: 
2nd Runner-Up: Maria Gilda Rodrigues (1955); Sônia Maria Ohana (1967);  (2003)
3rd Runner-Up: Rayana de Carvalho Brêda (2009)
4th Runner-Up: Luzia Aliete Borges (1956)
Top 5/Top 8/Top 9: Filomena Maria Chaves (1961); Nilda Rodrigues de Medeiros (1963); Margarida Monchery (1973)
Top 10/Top 11/Top 12: Márcia Mirella Alarcão (1979); Sheila Maria Chady (1980); Tatiana Raquel Selbmann (1994); Renata Karolyne França (1999); Waleska Tavares e Silva (2000); Bruna dos Santos Pontes (2008)
Top 15/Top 16: Naiane Figueiredo Alves (2007);  (2010); Ana Paula Henriques Padilha (2011); Anne Carolline Vieira Rodrigues (2013); Larissa Caroline de Oliveira (2014); Beatriz Guerche Ornela Arrifano (2022)

Special Awards
Miss Congeniality: Sandra Waleska Normando Tavares (1970); Iranilde Costa Ribeiro (1978)
Best State Costume:

Titleholders

Table Notes

References

External links
Official Miss Brasil Website

Women in Brazil
Pará
Miss Brazil state pageants